From Karkheh to Rhein is a 1993 Iranian film written and directed by Ebrahim Hatamikia starring Ali Dehkordi and Homa Rousta.

The film is first German-Iranian co-production.

Plot
Saeed is an Iran–Iraq war victim of chemical weapons who heads to Germany for Eye surgery and comes across his sister, Leila, who has been living in Cologne with her husband and son, Jonas for many years. Saeed gets his sight back after the surgery and tries to cope with the new and strange atmosphere around him. Saeed is getting ready to come back to Iran but everything goes wrong. Further examinations show that he suffers from leukemia. His disease has apparently resulted from chemical gases used by Iraq and sold by Germany in the war.

When Saeed's sister finds out about his disease, she tries to prevent any situation which will cause him stress, as the doctors advised. But Saeed becomes very ill when he watches the video of the funeral of Iran's revolutionary leader Ayatollah Khomeini, which was recorded by his brother in law. So, they take him to the hospital and he dies there while doing chemotherapy. This happens while Saeed's wife and his newly born baby are coming to Germany to meet him. The last scene of the film shows that the family of Saeed's sister is going back to Iran with his wife.

Cast
Ali Dehkordi as Saeed
Homa Rusta as Leila
Heinz Neumann as Leila's Husband
Asghar Naghizadeh as Basiji
Sadegh Safayi as Basiji
Farzaneh Asgari
Parviz Sheikhtadi
Noorbert Hanzing
Nikel Gril
Andreas Kurtz
Majid Safavi

Soundtrack
The music of the film was written and performed by Iranian composer Majid Entezami who later had collaboration with Hatamikia in The Glass Agency and The Scent of Joseph's Coat.

Track listing

See also
Karkheh, a river in Khuzestan Province, which was affected the most during the war
Disabled Iranian veterans

References

Exiternal links
 
 

1993 films
1993 multilingual films
1990s Persian-language films
Films directed by Ebrahim Hatamikia
Films shot in Germany
German multilingual films
Iranian multilingual films
Films set in Germany
Iran–Iraq War films
Films set in 1990
1990s war drama films
Iranian war drama films
Films about cancer
1993 drama films
Crystal Simorgh for Best Film winners